James Herold Dobson (born February 29, 1960) is a Canadian former professional ice hockey player and coach. He played in 12 National Hockey League (NHL) games as a forward with the Minnesota North Stars, Colorado Rockies, and Quebec Nordiques.

Career 
Dobson was drafted 90th overall by the Minnesota North Stars in 1979 after scoring 38 goals for the Portland Winter Hawks of the Western Hockey League (WHL). He returned to junior and scored 66 goals in 1979-80 and was named to the WHL first all-star team before spending his first pro season with the Oklahoma City Stars of the Central Hockey League (CHL). Over this time he was recalled for a few games in Minnesota but did not fit into the team's long term plans.

Dobson played a handful of games for the Colorado Rockies in 1981–82 and dressed for one contest with the Quebec Nordiques two years later. His best performance was a 36-goal effort for the Birmingham South Stars of the CHL in the 1982–83 season. Dobson retired in 1986 after playing 29 games for the New Haven Nighthawks of the American Hockey League.

After his playing career, Dobson coached the Seattle Thunderbirds of the WHL during the1987–88 season.

Career statistics

Regular season and playoffs

Awards
 WHL First All-Star Team – 1980

References

External links
 

1960 births
Living people
Birmingham South Stars players
Canadian ice hockey coaches
Canadian ice hockey forwards
Colorado Rockies (NHL) players
Fort Worth Texans players
Fredericton Express players
Minnesota North Stars draft picks
Minnesota North Stars players
Nashville South Stars players
New Haven Nighthawks players
New Westminster Bruins players
Oklahoma City Stars players
Portland Winterhawks players
Quebec Nordiques players
Seattle Thunderbirds coaches
Ice hockey people from Winnipeg
West Kelowna Warriors players